Made for Each Other (Spanish:Tal para cual) is a 1953 Mexican musical comedy film directed by Rogelio A. González and starring Jorge Negrete, María Elena Marqués and Luis Aguilar.

Main cast
 Jorge Negrete as Melitón Galván; Paco  
 María Elena Marqués as Susana de la Rosa  
 Luis Aguilar as Chabelo Cruz  
 Rosa de Castilla as Rosaura  
 Queta Lavat as Paula 
 Ana María Villaseñor as Carmela  
 Georgina González as Luz  
 Lupe Carriles as Nana Joaquina  
 Armando Arriola as Don Rafael García, padre de Paula  
 Bertha Lehar as Maestra  
 Jesús Valero as Doctor  
 Rodolfo Calvo as Presidente municipal  
 Raquel Muñoz as Amiga polla de Paco  
 José Pidal as Señor cura  
 María Luisa Cortés as Amiga polla de Paco  
 Diana Ochoa as Madre de Luz y Carmela

References

Bibliography 
 Sergio de la Mora. Cinemachismo: Masculinities and Sexuality in Mexican Film. University of Texas Press, 2009.

External links 
 

1953 films
1953 musical comedy films
Mexican musical comedy films
1950s Spanish-language films
Films directed by Rogelio A. González
Films scored by Manuel Esperón
Mexican black-and-white films
1950s Mexican films